Fox snake or foxsnake is the common name given to some North American rat snakes of the genus Pantherophis. It is generally agreed that there are two such species, but three candidate species names have arisen for them:
 Pantherophis gloydi (eastern fox snake), originally described by Conant in 1940, merged with P. vulpinus in 2011
 Pantherophis vulpinus (foxsnake or western fox snake or eastern fox snake), originally described by Baird and Girard in 1853
 Pantherophis ramspotti (western fox snake), originally described by Crother, White, Savage, Eckstut, Graham and Gardner in 2011

Colubrids
Set index articles on snakes
Snake common names